Bermicourt is a commune in the Pas-de-Calais department in the Hauts-de-France region in northern France.

Geography
A small farming village located 28 miles (47 km) northwest of Arras on the D98 road.

History 
On 15 September 1916, during the First World War, shortly before Haig's attack on Flers, the British Tank Corps, equipped with its new 'secret weapon', the tank, and commanded by General Hugh Elles set up its headquarters at Chateau de Bermicourt. At that time the chateau belonged to Count Jean de Hauteclocque. The headquarters remained stationed there until the end of the war.

Population

Sights
 The church of Notre-Dame, dating from the sixteenth century.
 The château.

See also
Communes of the Pas-de-Calais department

References

External links

 Hotel - Restaurant at Bermicourt 

Communes of Pas-de-Calais